What It Means to Be King is the second studio album by American rapper King Von. It was posthumously released through Empire Distribution and Only the Family on March 4, 2022. The album features guest appearances from G Herbo, 21 Savage, Fivio Foreign, Moneybagg Yo, Lil Durk, Tee Grizzley, A Boogie wit da Hoodie, Dreezy, Boss Top, DqFrmDaO, and OMB Peezy. Production was handled by Chopsquad DJ, Hitmaka, Tee Romano, Kid Hazel, Touch of Trent, DJ Bandz, DJ FMCT, Glaazer, Diego Ave, Bankroll Got It, TM88, ATL Jacob, Geraldo Liive, CGM Beats, John Lam, and Raw Equity. The album marks Von's first posthumous project and serves as the follow-up to his previous album, Welcome to O'Block (2020).

Background
On November 6, 2020, King Von died from being shot outside a hookah lounge in Atlanta, Georgia, exactly one week after the release of his previous album, Welcome to O'Block (2020). The same day of his death, American rapper Pooh Shiesty released his single, "Back in Blood", which features Von's Only the Family label boss, fellow rapper Lil Durk. Von made his first posthumous cameo appearance in the music video for the song, which was released on January 2, 2021, in which the title of his album was revealed.

Release and promotion
The lead single of the album, "Grandson for President", was released on April 29, 2020. The second single, "Don't Play That", a collaboration with Atlanta-based rapper 21 Savage, was released on February 4, 2022, exactly one month before the album. The same day, Von's estate shared the title of the album and its release date. On February 28, 2022, they shared the cover art of the album and put the album up on Apple Music for pre-order. The third single, "War", was released on March 2, 2022. The tracklist was revealed on Apple Music the following day. A music video for "Get It Done" with OMB Peezy was released on August 9, 2022, in honor of what would have been King Von's 28th birthday.

Commercial performance
What It Means to Be King debuted at number 2 on the US Billboard 200 chart, earning 59,000 album-equivalent units, 55,000 came from 79 million in streams, and 4,000 pure album sales. The new album is the second top 10 for King Von, who first reached the top 10 with his debut studio album, Welcome to O’Block, which climbed from 13 to 5 (its peak) on the Nov. 21, 2020-dated chart, following news of his death.

Track listing

Note

  signifies a co-producer.

Samples
 "Grandson for President" contains a sample of "Knuck If You Buck" as performed by Crime Mob featuring Lil Scrappy, written by Jarques Usher, Chris Henderson, Jonathan Lewis, Venetia Lewis and Brittany Carpentero.

Charts

Weekly charts

Year-end charts

References

2022 albums
King Von albums
Empire Distribution albums
Hip-hop albums released posthumously